Pingali Venkayya (2 August 1876/8 – 4 July 1963) was an Indian freedom fighter and a Gandhian. He was the designer of the flag on which the Indian National Flag was based. He was also as a lecturer, author, geologist, educationalist, agriculturist, and a polyglot.

At the age of 19, Venkayya had enrolled in the British Indian Army and was deployed to South Africa during the Second Boer War (1899–1902). During the war when the soldiers had to salute the Union Jack, the national flag of Britain, Venkayya realised the need for having a flag for Indians. When Venkayya attended the AICC session in 1906 in Calcutta, he was inspired to design a flag for the Indian National Congress as he opposed the idea of hoisting the British flag at Congress meetings.

Various flags had been used by members of the Indian independence movement before independence was achieved in 1947. Pingali Venkayya designed the National Flag and presented it to Mahatma Gandhi during the latter’s visit to Vijayawada city on 1 April 1921.  Venkayya’s first draft of the flag was in red and green — the red representing Hindus and green the Muslims living in the country. On Gandhi’s suggestion, Venkayya added a white stripe to represent all other denominations and religions present in India. Since 1921, Venkayya's flag has been used informally at all Congress meetings. The flag was adopted in its present form during a meeting of the Constituent Assembly on July 22, 1947.

Venkayya was an agriculturist and also an educationist who set up an educational institution in Machilipatnam. He died in relative poverty in 1963 and was largely forgotten by society. A postage stamp was issued to commemorate him in 2009. In 2012, his name was proposed for a posthumous Bharat Ratna though there has been no response from the central government on the proposal.

Early life 
Pingali Venkayya was born in a Telugu Brahmin family on 2 August 1876 or 1878 at Bhatlapenumarru, near Machilipatnam, in what is now the Indian state of Andhra Pradesh. His parents were Hanumantha Rayudu and Venkata Ratnam. He studied at the Hindu High School in Machilipatnam. He also spent his childhood in various places in the Krishna district like Yarlagadda and Pedakallepalli. He married Rukminamma, the daughter of the Karanam of Pamarru village.

At the age of 19, he enrolled in the British Indian Army and was deployed to South Africa during the Second Boer War (1899–1902), where he met Gandhi for the first time. It was during the war when the soldiers had to salute the Union Jack, the national flag of Britain, that Venkayya realised the need for having a flag for Indians.

Career 
Venkayya earned a diploma in Geology from the Madras Presidency College. From 19111944, he worked as a lecturer at the Andhra National College in Machilipatnam. From 1924 to 1944, he researched mica in Nellore. He also authored a book titled 'Thalli Raayi' on geology.

Venkayya was also popularly nicknamed 'Diamond Venkayya', as he was an expert in diamond mining. He was also called 'Patti Venkayya' (Cotton Venkayya), because he dedicated most of his time to researching staple varieties of cotton and did a detailed study on a variety called Cambodia Cotton. He was a polyglot who was proficient in many languages including Japanese and Urdu. He delivered a full-length speech in Japanese at a school in Bapatla in 1913. From then, he also came to be referred to as 'Japan Venkayya'.

Design of national flag 
When Venkayya attended the All India Congress Committee (AICC) session in 1906 in Calcutta under the leadership of Dadabhai Naoroji, he was inspired to design a flag for the Indian National Congress as he opposed the idea of hoisting the British flag at Congress meetings. Venkayya worked on potential designs that could be used as flags for the newly-coined Swaraj movement to signify independence. There were over 25 drafts of the flags with different significance and relations with Indian culture, heritage and history. In 1916, he published a book titled Bharatha Desaniki Oka Jatiya Patakam with 30 potential designs for a flag. From 1918 to 1921, he proposed various ideas to Congress leadership. At the time, he was also working at the Andhra National College in Machilipatnam.

In 1921, the AICC held its two-day crucial session in Bezawada (now Vijayawada) on March 31 and April 1. When Gandhi asked Venkayya to submit a design for the flag at the session, he did it within three hours. Venkayya had shown Gandhi a rudimentary design of a flag on a Khadi bunting. This first flag was coloured red and green — the red representing Hindus and the green representing Muslims in the country. On Gandhi’s suggestion, Venkayya added a white stripe to represent all the other denominations and religions present in the country. While the flag was not officially adopted by the AICC, which reordered the stripes and changed the red to orange in 1931, it came to be used across the country. Since 1921, Venkayya's flag has been used informally at all Congress meetings. The flag was adopted in its present form during a meeting of the Constituent Assembly on July 22, 1947, twenty days before India's Independence.

Death and legacy 

Venkayya lived humbly according to Gandhian ideologies and died in 1963 in relative poverty. Venkayya’s daughter Ghantasala Seetha Mahalakshmi passed away on 21 July 2022 at the age of 100. 

A postage stamp to commemorate Venkayya and the first flag was issued in 2009. Vijayawada station of the All India Radio was named after him in 2014. In 2012, his name was proposed for a posthumous Bharat Ratna though there has been no response from the central government on the proposal. 

In 1992, then Chief Minister of Andhra Pradesh N. T. Rama Rao commissioned a statue of Venkayya – one among the 31 state icons – at Necklace Road in Hyderabad. In January 2015, a statue of him was unveiled by the then Urban Development Minister Venkaiah Naidu, in the forelawns of the All India Radio building in Vijayawada. Several statues of Venkayya have been built all over Andhra Pradesh.

References

Sources 

 

1963 deaths
Flag designers
People from Krishna district
1870s births
20th-century Indian designers
Artists from Andhra Pradesh
19th-century Indian people

Postage stamps depicting people